was a general in the Imperial Japanese Army and Minister of War.

Biography
Kigoshi was born as the eldest son to a samurai family of the Kaga Domain (present day Kanazawa, Ishikawa Prefecture). In 1875, while still a student at the very first class of the Imperial Japanese Army Academy, he participated in combat during the Satsuma Rebellion. He was sent as a military attaché for training in Prussia from 1883.  After his return to Japan, Kigoshi served as Chief of Staff of the IJA 3rd Division in the First Sino-Japanese War.

In 1898, Kigoshi was promoted to major general and was assigned as Chief of Staff of the Taiwan Army of Japan. From 1901 to 1902, he served on the Imperial Japanese Army General Staff and was given a field command again during the Russo-Japanese War, where he commanded of the IJA 23rd Infantry Brigade, which especially distinguished itself during the Battle of Sandepu.

After the war, he served on the staff of the Manchurian Army, and subsequently as commander of the IJA 1st Division, IJA 5th Division and IJA 6th Division. In 1907, he was ennobled with the title of baron (danshaku) under the kazoku peerage system.

Kigoshi was also promoted to lieutenant general in 1907. In January 1913, he became Minister of War under the First Yamamoto Gonnohyōe cabinet. He entered the reserves in 1914, and retired from military service immediately afterwards. From 1920 until his death in 1932, Kigoshi served as a member of the House of Peers in the Diet of Japan. His grave is at Aoyama Cemetery in Tokyo.

References

Books

External links

Notes

1854 births
1932 deaths
Politicians from Ishikawa Prefecture
Japanese generals
Japanese military personnel of the First Sino-Japanese War
Japanese military personnel of the Russo-Japanese War
Ministers of the Imperial Japanese Army
Members of the House of Peers (Japan)
Military personnel from Ishikawa Prefecture